Liúgézhuāng (留格庄) may refer to:

 Liugezhuang, Dacheng County, town in Hebei, China
 Liugezhuang, Haiyang, town in Haiyang, Shandong, China